"Make It Funky" is a 1971 two-part single by James Brown.

Make It Funky may also refer to:

 "Make It Funky", a single by American rapper Ice-T on his 1987 debut album Rhyme Pays
 "Make It Funky", a song by Paul Robb on the 1988 album Information Society (album)
 "Make It Funky", a 1988 single by hip hop duo Audio Two
 Make It Funky – The Big Payback: 1971–1975, a 1996 compilation album by James Brown that includes the song Make It Funky, parts 1, 2, 3 and 4
 Make It Funky (film), a 2005 American documentary film

See also
 "This Time Make It Funky", a 1991 single by Tracie Spencer